Altair Gomes de Figueiredo, usually referred to as Altair (January 22, 1938 – August 9, 2019), was a football defender and a World Champion for Brazil in the 1962 World Cup.

He spent his entire career at Fluminense, for which he played 551 games, scoring twice. He was called “magro” (slim) because he was skinny and despite his modest physical appearance, was a tough tackler and tremendous marker. His duels with Garrincha were legendary. He retired from playing in 1971 aged 33.

References

External links

1938 births
2019 deaths
Brazilian footballers
Association football defenders
Fluminense FC players
Sport Club do Recife players
Fluminense FC managers
1962 FIFA World Cup players
1966 FIFA World Cup players
FIFA World Cup-winning players
Brazil international footballers
Afro-Brazilian sportspeople
Brazilian football managers
Sportspeople from Niterói